Black Sails is an American historical adventure television series set on New Providence Island and written to be a prequel to Robert Louis Stevenson's 1883 novel Treasure Island. The series was created by Jonathan E. Steinberg and Robert Levine for Starz. It debuted online for free on YouTube and other various streaming platform and video-on-demand services on January 18, 2014. The debut on cable television followed a week later on January 25, 2014. Steinberg is executive producer, alongside Michael Bay, Brad Fuller and Andrew Form, while Michael Angeli, Doris Egan, and Levine are co-executive producers. The show features treasure-seeking pirates fending off British government attempts to stop them.

On July 26, 2013, Starz renewed the show for a ten-episode second season, which premiered on January 24, 2015. The early renewal, six months before the first season premiered, was based on the positive fan reaction to the show at the San Diego Comic-Con. The series was renewed for a third season on October 12, 2014, and a fourth season on July 31, 2015, both before the respective previous seasons had premiered. On July 20, 2016, Starz announced that the series' fourth season would be its last; the season premiered on January 29, 2017, and the series concluded on April 2, 2017.

Plot

Black Sails is set in the early 18th century, roughly two decades before the events of Treasure Island, during the Golden Age of Piracy. Feared Captain Flint brings on a younger crew member as they fight for the survival of New Providence island. According to the first episode, "In 1715 West Indies, the pirates of New Providence Island threaten maritime trade in the region. The laws of every civilized nation declare them hostis humani generis, enemies of all mankind. In response, the pirates adhere to a doctrine of their own....war against the world." Real life pirates who are fictionalized in the show include Anne Bonny, Benjamin Hornigold, Jack Rackham, Charles Vane, Ned Low, Israel Hands and Blackbeard.

The plot of the first season focuses on the hunt for the Spanish treasure galleon Urca de Lima. At the beginning of the second season, the treasure from the Urca de Lima has been stranded on the shores of Florida with Spanish soldiers guarding it, but by the conclusion of the second season, the treasure has been taken by Jack Rackham and his crew and brought to New Providence Island. During the second season, the questions of how and why Flint—a man who was a navy officer and London gentleman—turned to piracy are answered. The third and the fourth seasons focus on the war for the control of New Providence between the pirates and the British Empire, represented by Captain Woodes Rogers.

Cast

 Toby Stephens as James McGraw/Flint
 Hannah New as Eleanor Guthrie
 Luke Arnold as "Long" John Silver
 Jessica Parker Kennedy as Max
 Tom Hopper as William "Billy Bones" Manderly
 Zach McGowan as Charles Vane (seasons 1–3)
 Toby Schmitz as Jack Rackham
 Clara Paget as Anne Bonny
 Mark Ryan as Hal Gates (season 1)
 Hakeem Kae-Kazim as Mr. Scott (seasons 1–3)
 Sean Cameron Michael as Richard Guthrie (seasons 1–2)
 Louise Barnes as Miranda Hamilton/Barlow (seasons 1–3)
 Rupert Penry-Jones as Lord Thomas Hamilton (seasons 2, 4)
 Luke Roberts as Woodes Rogers (seasons 3–4)
 Ray Stevenson as Edward Teach (seasons 3–4)
 David Wilmot as Israel Hands (season 4)
 Harriet Walter as Marion Guthrie (season 4)

Production
The series is filmed at Cape Town Film Studios in Cape Town, South Africa, with local production company Film Afrika.

The opening title sequence was made by Imaginary Forces and directors Michelle Dougherty and Karin Fong with the backing sea chantey-inspired theme composed by Battlestar Galactica and The Walking Dead composer Bear McCreary. It accurately features an instrument of the period in the form of the hurdy-gurdy.

For the amount of detail that was added to the vessels, it took over 300 workers to build just one ship.

In real life, recurring actor Nick Boraine is Louise Barnes's husband; Anna-Louise Plowman and Chris Larkin are, respectively, Toby Stephens's wife and brother; and Guy Paul is Harriet Walter's husband.

Reception
The first season of Black Sails received mixed reviews from critics. On Rotten Tomatoes the season holds a rating of 65%, based on 49 reviews, with an average rating of 6.05/10. The site's consensus reads, "Black Sails boasts visual appeal, but the show's bland characters aren't strong enough to keep the show from being dragged down into its murky depths of aimless exposition". On Metacritic season one has a score of 58 of 100, based on 27 critics, indicating "mixed or average reviews".

Tim Goodman of The Hollywood Reporter said, "This ambitious pirate story is helped immensely by going beyond the pay cable freedoms that often bog down lesser shows in boobs, blood and sex. Black Sails steers itself out of that realm after a few episodes and makes a play for bigger, more complicated stories". Robert Lloyd of the Los Angeles Times said, "Black Sails is a pirate treasure. The Starz series vividly depicts the daily life of pirates." Jeff Jensen of Entertainment Weekly said, "Not even a guilty pleasure, Black Sails is arrrrrr-estingly good". Tom Long of the Detroit News commented "Alliances are made and broken, power shifts go this way and that, blood is spilled, and wenches keep wenching. It's oddly addictive, and the cast—made up mostly of British, Australian, and Canadian actors—is as sharp as you'd expect from pay cable".

Conversely, Brian Lowry of Variety said, "Black Sails never quite takes off, developing into a tired treasure hunt with indifferent casting and stock characters. Counting Michael Bay among its producers, this South Africa–lensed production might tempt adventure-seeking viewers to plunge into its crystal-blue waters, but despite some handsome aspects, the show ultimately proves as hollow as its CGI-rendered ships". Emily VanDerWerff of The A.V. Club said, "Black Sails is a handsome illusion at times, but it rarely finds its way beyond that."

The second season holds a 100% rating on Rotten Tomatoes, based on 8 reviews, with an average rating of 8.7/10.  Neil Genzlinger of The New York Times said, "Starz knows the formula for these costume-heavy action dramas from experience with shows like Spartacus and Camelot. And that formula is executed with particular skill in Black Sails, thanks to some strong performances and an exploration of the consequences of greed that could have come out of modern-day Wall Street".

Season four holds a 80% rating on Rotten Tomatoes based on 10 reviews, with an average rating of 7.8/10. The site's critical consensus reads: "Black Sails marks 'X' and hits the spot during a swashbuckling final season that maintains the series' penchant for rum-soaked spectacle while gracefully delivering these roguish characters to their destinies."

Accolades

References

External links
 
 
 

2014 American television series debuts
2017 American television series endings
2010s American LGBT-related drama television series
American adventure television series
American prequel television series
Bisexuality-related television series
English-language television shows
Lesbian-related television shows
Television series set in the 18th century
Cultural depictions of Blackbeard
Cultural depictions of Anne Bonny
Cultural depictions of Calico Jack
Television series about pirates
Nautical television series
Serial drama television series
Starz original programming
Television shows filmed in South Africa